Wang Weiyi can refer to:

 Wang Weiyi (physician) (王惟一, 987-1067), Chinese physician
 Wang Weiyi (filmmaker) (王为一, 1912—2013), Chinese film director and screenwriter
 Wang Weiyi (biathlete) (born 1967), Chinese biathlete
 Wang Weiyi (sport shooter) (王炜一, born 1974), Chinese sport shooter
 Wang Weiyi (volleyball) (born 1995), Chinese volleyball player